Herman Weisberg is a former New York City Police Department detective, known for his work as a private investigator. Weisberg is credited with locating Russian fugitive Viktoria Nasyrova. Weisberg is the founder and Managing director of the Sage Intelligence Group. He is frequently involved in high-profile cases involving extortion scandals. Weisberg has worked as top investigator for New York District Attorney Robert M. Morgenthau on investigations into extortions, financial crimes and other complex criminal cases. Weisberg’s most notable case with Morgenthau involved Robert “Joe” Halderman’s blackmail attempt on comedian David Letterman.

Television, radio, and press
In 2017 Weisberg featured in an episode of the CBS show 48 Hours, titled "Red Notice for Murder".

An interview with Weisberg was the feature of an episode of the ABC TV show 20/20.

Weisberg's work as private detective and fixer in the field of extortion was featured in an article by Town & Country magazine.

High profile cases

Weisberg was the lead investigator in the 2002 $600 million fraud scandal of Tyco Corporation

In 2010, Weisberg worked with NYC district attorney Robert Morgenthau on the case involving a blackmail attempt on David Letterman.

In 2018, Benjamin Brafman, lawyer for film producer Harvey Weinstein, hired Weisberg to investigate on behalf of his client.

References

External links
Sage Intelligence Group

1966 births
Living people
New York City Police Department officers